George Meikle (22 October 1916 – 25 July 1991) was an Australian cricketer. He played seven first-class cricket matches for Victoria between 1938 and 1941.

See also
 List of Victoria first-class cricketers

References

External links
 

1916 births
1991 deaths
Australian cricketers
Victoria cricketers
Cricketers from Melbourne